Charif Majdalani is a French-Lebanese writer. Born in Beirut in 1960, he is a novelist and professor at Saint Joseph University, where he was head of the Department of French Literature from 1999 to 2008. A member of the editorial board of L'Orient littéraire, he is also President of the International Writers’ House in Beirut.

Life
Between 2005 and 2017, he published six novels in French. According to one critic, "Majdalani's novels are much praised in the Francophone world, and with good reason. His seductive prose twists and turns, deftly matching hallucinatory content with form." and have been translated into several languages.  

The novels have been shortlisted for many important French and francophone prizes (Renaudot, Fémina, Médicis, Wepler, Jean Giono, Valéry Larbaud, Joseph Kessel, Albert Cohen, du Salon du livre de Genève, de la FNAC, des Libraire).  He won the Jean Giono Prize (2015), as well as the Tropiques Prize (2008), the François Mauriac Prize of the French Academy (2008), the France-Liban prize (2016), the Phénix Prize (2005) and the Moise Khayrallah Prize of the North Carolina State University (2017).

Bibliography
 Histoire de la grande maison, Seuil, 2005 (Prix Phénix)
 Das Haus in den Orangengärten, Knaus Verlag 2007
 La Casa nel giardino degli aranci, Giunti 2010
 البيت الكبير ، Dar AnNahar, 2008
 Το Μεγάλο Σπίτι, Castaniotis, 2015

 Caravansérail, Seuil, 2007 (Prix Tropiques, Prix François Mauriac de l'Académie française)
 Ein Palast Auf Reisen, Knaus Verlag, 2009.
 Moving the Palace, New Vessel Press, 2017 (Moise Khayrallah Prize)

 Nos si brèves années de gloire, Seuil, 2012

 Le Dernier Seigneur de Marsad, Seuil, 2013
 سيّد المرصد الأخير , Hachette-Antoine, 2014

 Villa des Femmes, Seuil, 2015 (Grand Prix Jean Giono, Prix France-Liban)
 فيلاّ النساء , Hachette Antoine, 2018

 L'Empereur à Pied, Seuil, 2017

 Beyrouth 2020: Journal d'un effondrement, Actes Sud, 2020 (Prix Femina Special Jury Prize)

 Beirut 2020: The Collapse of a Civilization, a Journal, Mountain Leopard Press, 2021

 Dernière oasis, Actes Sud, 2021

References

1960 births
French male novelists
Lebanese novelists
Living people
Writers from Beirut
Aix-Marseille University alumni
Academic staff of Saint Joseph University